Bohol's 1st congressional district is one of the three congressional districts of the Philippines in the province of Bohol. It has been represented in the House of Representatives of the Philippines since 1916 and earlier in the Philippine Assembly from 1907 to 1916. The district consists of the provincial capital city of Tagbilaran and adjacent municipalities of Alburquerque, Antequera, Baclayon, Balilihan, Calape, Catigbian, Corella, Cortes, Dauis, Loon, Maribojoc, Panglao, Sikatuna and Tubigon. It is currently represented in the 18th Congress by Edgar Chatto of the Liberal Party (LP).

Representation history

Election results

2022

2019

2016

2013

2010

See also
Legislative districts of Bohol

References

Congressional districts of the Philippines
Politics of Bohol
1907 establishments in the Philippines
Congressional districts of Central Visayas
Constituencies established in 1907